Bayram Özdemir (born 1 January 1976) is a Turkish wrestler. He competed in the men's Greco-Roman 48 kg at the 1996 Summer Olympics.

References

External links
 

1976 births
Living people
Turkish male sport wrestlers
Olympic wrestlers of Turkey
Wrestlers at the 1996 Summer Olympics
Place of birth missing (living people)